Oakland Cemetery is a public, not-for-profit cemetery located in the village Sag Harbor, New York. It was founded in 1840 and  currently sits on 26 acres bounded by Jermain Ave to the north, Suffolk St to the east, and Joels Ln to the west. It is the permanent resting place of over 4,000 people, including more 18th and 19th century sea captains than in any other Long Island cemetery. It was incorporated in 1884.

History 
Prior to the opening of Oakland Cemetery in 1840, Sag Harbor's most notable cemetery was the Old Burial Ground, opened in 1767 on the corner of Union and Madison Streets next to the First Presbyterian Church. At total of 17 veterans of the American Revolution and one representative to the New York Provincial Congress of 1775 are buried there. Unfortunately, years of neglect left the Old Burial Ground in a state of disrepair.

In 1840 Oakland Cemetery was founded, covering just 4 acres, enclosed with stone posts and chestnut pickets. One-hundred-thirty-nine graves from the Old Burial Ground were moved to Oakland Cemetery, including Ebenezer Sage and Captain David Hand and his five wives.

During the mid-1800s, in the center of the property which is now Oakland Cemetery, sat of a group of buildings known as Oakland Works. John Sherry had them built in 1850 to house his brass foundry. He soon took on a partner, Ephraim N. Byram, a clock maker and astronomer who was later buried in the cemetery. They enlarged the building to make room for Byram’s clock manufactory and named the place the Oakland Brass Foundry and Clock Works. The business was in operation for 12 years.

In 1863 the building was leased to Abraham DeBevoise and B. & F.  Lyon for use as a stocking factory. In 1865 a second building and another bleach house were added to the property. This business closed after three years.

Over the next ten years two other industries occupied the Oakland Works. First, a barrel-head and stave factory owned by George Bush; then, a Morocco leather business owned by Morgan Topping. Both proved unsuccessful.

A final attempt to operate a business on the site was made in 1880 when Edward Chapman Rogers opened the Oakland Hat Manufactory. This venture also failed.

In 1882, unoccupied for almost two years, the old wooden structures caught fire and burned to the ground. The site was purchased by Joseph Fahys and Stephen French and donated to the cemetery.

In September 1884 the Oakland Cemetery Association purchased the remaining Oakland Works property for $400, adding a third section and extending the cemetery east to its present boundary at Suffolk St for a total of ten acres.

In October, 1903 the Ladies Village Improvement Society unveiled a new memorial gate

Notable monuments 

The Broken Mast Monument in Oakland Cemetery, sculpted by Robert Eberhard Launitz, commemorates those "Who periled their lives in a daring profession and perished in actual encounter with the monsters of the deep."

Notable burials 
Shana Alexander, journalist
Nelson Algren, author
"Cappy" Hjalmar Amundsen, artist, historian
Stephen Antonakos, sculptor 
George Balanchine, ballet choreographer and co-founder of the New York City Ballet
Hobart Betts, architect
Ephraim N. Byrum, astronomer, clock maker, scientist, bookbinder
Henry Billings, artist
Marion Barbara "Joe" Carstairs, heiress and power boat driver
Henry Francis Cook, U.S. manufacturer and financier
Alexandra Danilova, ballerina
Phil Dusenberry, American advertising executive
Caldwell Edwards, US Representative from Montana
Joseph Fahys, watch case and silverware manufacturer
Manucher Mirza Farman Farmaian
Abol-Bashar Mirza Farman Farmaian
Clay Felker, magazine editor and journalist
Robert Fizdale, pianist
Hermine Freed, painter and video artist
Stephen b. French, President of the Board of Commissioners, New York City Police Dept. (1880-1889)
James Ingo Freed, architect
William Gaddis, author
Arthur Gold, pianist
Spalding Gray, author and performance artist
Christopher Haile, artist
Captain David Hand, Revolutionary War hero whose exploits supposedly inspired James Fenimore Cooper's character Natty Bumpo from the Leatherstocking Tales novels. Hand was Coopers's first mate aboard the Whale Ship Salem.
Hans Hokanson, Swedish artist
Richard Holbrooke, US diplomat, editor, author
Benjamin Huntting, merchant whaler
Heyward Isham, US Ambassador 
Sandra Isham Vreeland, poet
Michael Kalil, abstract interior designer
Max Lerner, journalist
Gordon Matta-Clark, artist
David Maysles, documentary filmmaker 
Prentice Mulford, author and humorist
Hans Namuth, photographer
John F. Osborne, editor and journalist
Robert Parrish, American film director, editor, writer, and child actor
Olive Pharaoh, Queen of the Montauketts
Anna Pump, chef, author
Ebenezer Sage US Representative from New York
James Salter, author
Jawn Sandifer, American civil rights attorney, judge and New York State Supreme Court Justice
Herbert Scarf, mathematician
Charles P Sifton, US federal judge
Robert Sklar, American film historian
Lorimer Stoddard, playwright
Richard Henry Stoddard, critic, poet
Horatio Nelson Taft, diarist and patent examiner
Daisy Tapley, Contralto, Vaudeville performer of the early Harlem Renaissance
Val Telberg, artist
William Wallace Tooker, ethnographer, photographer
Lanford Wilson, playwright
In addition to its more famous residents, Oakland Cemetery is home to some of the most prominent family names on the East End of Long Island including Sleight, Huntting, Howell, Conklin, Wade, Hildreth, Halsey, Cooper, Mulford, French, Byrum, and Fahys.

Further reading
The Diary of Horatio Nelson Taft
The William Wallace Tooker Photographic Collection
Detailed walking tour compiled by the Sag Harbor Partnership

See also
List of Cemeteries in the United States

References

External links 

Grave Stone Inscriptions from Oakland Cemetery
Oakland Cemetery Military Grave Sites
Sag Harbor Historical Society
Marquis Who's Who

Southampton (town), New York
Tourist attractions in Suffolk County, New York
East Hampton (town), New York
Sag Harbor, New York
Cemeteries in Suffolk County, New York